Armaghan Elahi (born 1 January 1981) is a Pakistani first-class cricketer who played for Abbottabad cricket team.

References

External links
 

1981 births
Living people
Pakistani cricketers
Abbottabad cricketers
Cricketers from Abbottabad